Mesut Bakkal (born 19 March 1964) is a Turkish professional football manager and former player.

A midfielder, he played for Denizlispor, and later was manager of Ankaragücü, Denizlispor, Gaziantepspor, Gençlerbirliği S.K., Karabükspor, Manisaspor, and Samsunspor. He was head coach of BB Erzurumspor until March 2021.

Career
Born in Kırıkkale to Circassian parents from Bilecik, Northwest Turkey, Bakkal began playing football for local side Kırıkkalespor. He would later play for Denizlispor, Afyonspor, and İzmirspor before retiring from active play in 1994.

After his playing career ended, Bakkal became a football manager. He resigned as Gençlerbirliği's manager for the second time in his career, on 3 November 2008.

In 2009 he received a UEFA Pro License.

References

External links
  (as player)
  (as coach)
 
 

1964 births
Living people
People from Kırıkkale
Turkish people of Circassian descent
Turkish footballers
Turkey youth international footballers
Turkey under-21 international footballers
Denizlispor footballers
Afyonkarahisarspor footballers
İzmirspor footballers
Association football midfielders
Turkish football managers
Gençlerbirliği S.K. managers
Gaziantepspor managers
Denizlispor managers
Manisaspor managers
Sivasspor managers
MKE Ankaragücü managers
Samsunspor managers
Kardemir Karabükspor managers
Konyaspor managers
Mersin İdman Yurdu managers
Kayserispor managers
Alanyaspor managers
Bursaspor managers

Süper Lig managers